Adıyaman is an electoral district of the Grand National Assembly of Turkey. It elects five members of parliament (deputies) to represent the province of the same name for a four-year term by the D'Hondt method, a party-list proportional representation system.

Members 
Population reviews of each electoral district are conducted before each general election, which can lead to certain districts being granted a smaller or greater number of parliamentary seats. Adıyaman's seats fell from six to five in the 2002 general election.

General elections

1957

1961

1965

1969

1973

1977

1983

1987

1991

1995

1999

2002

2007

2011

June 2015

November 2015

2018

Presidential elections

2014

2018

References 

Electoral districts of Turkey
Politics of Adıyaman Province